Brimin Kipruto (born 31 July 1985) is a Kenyan professional middle distance runner who specialises in the 3000 metres steeplechase. He was born in Korkitony, Keiyo District. He holds a personal best of 7:53.64 minutes which is the second fastest time ever run, and the African Record.  His personal best is only 0.01 of a second behind the world record of former county mate Saif Saaeed Shaheen, who switched national affiliation to Qatar after growing up as Stephen Cherono in the Keiyo District.

He won a silver medal at the 2004 Summer Olympics at the age of nineteen and improved to win the gold medal at the 2008 Beijing Olympics four years later. A World Championships bronze medallist in 2005, he took his first global title in the steeplechase with a win at the 2007 World Championships in Athletics.

Career
At the 2001 World Youth Championships in Athletics in Debrecen, Hungary he finished second in steeplechase. He graduated from Kipsoen Secondary School in 2003. The same year he competed at the African Junior Championships in Cameroon and took silver again. At the 2004 World Junior Championships in Athletics he competed in 1500 instead of steeplechase and finished third.

In 2004, having finished 2nd at the Kenyan Olympic trials, the young Kipruto won the silver medal in the 3000 m steeplechase at the 2004 Olympic Games. In the 2005 World Championships in Helsinki he won a bronze medal in the same event. He finished third again at the 2005 IAAF World Athletics Final. In 2006 he finished sixth at the World Athletics Final, repeating his place from 2004.

In 2007, he won the gold medal in the steeplechase at the World Championships, in Osaka. After qualifying to the 2008 Beijing Olympics, Kipruto finally won the gold medal at the same event. At the 2009 World Championships, the defending champion finished only seventh.

He took two wins on the 2010 IAAF Diamond League circuit, finishing in first place at the Athletissima and Meeting Areva, but it was Kenyan rival Paul Kipsiele Koech who went on to win the inaugural Diamond League trophy in the steeplechase. He entered the 2010 Commonwealth Games with the fastest mark of the year (8:00.90), but could only manage third place behind Richard Mateelong and Ezekiel Kemboi as part of a Kenyan medal sweep.

He competed in the short race at the Great Edinburgh Cross Country and finished in third place behind Eliud Kipchoge and Asbel Kiprop.

He lives in Korkitony and trains with the Global Sports group in Kaptagat near Eldoret under coaches Patrick Sang and Joseph Chelimo.

Personal best 
1500 Metres – 	3:35.23 (2006) 	 
3000 Metres  –	7:47.33 (2006)
2000 Metres Steeplechase  –	5:36.81 (2001)  	 
3000 Metres Steeplechase  –	7:53.64 (2011)

Achievements

References

External links

IAAF Focus on Athletes

1985 births
Living people
People from Elgeyo-Marakwet County
Kenyan male middle-distance runners
Athletes (track and field) at the 2004 Summer Olympics
Athletes (track and field) at the 2008 Summer Olympics
Athletes (track and field) at the 2012 Summer Olympics
Athletes (track and field) at the 2016 Summer Olympics
Olympic gold medalists for Kenya
Olympic silver medalists for Kenya
Olympic athletes of Kenya
Commonwealth Games medallists in athletics
Kenyan male steeplechase runners
World Athletics Championships medalists
Medalists at the 2008 Summer Olympics
Medalists at the 2004 Summer Olympics
Athletes (track and field) at the 2010 Commonwealth Games
World Athletics Championships athletes for Kenya
Commonwealth Games bronze medallists for Kenya
Olympic gold medalists in athletics (track and field)
Olympic silver medalists in athletics (track and field)
World Athletics Championships winners
Medallists at the 2010 Commonwealth Games